This is a list of alumni chapters for the Tau Beta Pi (TBP) engineering honor society. Of the 79 Alumni Chapters, 47 are active. Inactive chapters are noted in italics.

District 1

District 2

District 3

District 4

District 5

District 6

District 7
Comprising lower peninsula Michigan and Ohio, TBP's District 7 is home to four active Alumni Chapters. Ohio's North Coast Alumni Chapter (ONCAC) is the sole active alumni chapter in the state of Ohio. Michigan is home to West Michigan Alumni Chapter, Southeastern Michigan Alumni Chapter (SEMIAC), and the most recent District 7 Alumni Chapter, the Ann Arbor Area Alumni Chapter (AAAAC).

District 8

District 9

District 10

District 11

District 12

District 13

District 14

District 15

District 16

See also
 Tau Beta Pi

References

Lists of chapters of United States student societies by society
 Alumni chapters